Breach of Faith: A Family of Cops 2 is a 1997 American made-for-television crime drama film starring Charles Bronson sequel to Family of Cops. In the film, Joe Penny takes over the role of eldest son Ben Fein, who was played by Daniel Baldwin in the first film. This was the second-to-last film Bronson starred in before his death in 2003.

Plot
The Fein family of police, led by Paul Fein, now a police commissioner, investigate the murder of a local priest who had ties with the Russian Mafia, who proceed to try to draw the family off the case. Paul's eldest son Detective Ben and youngest son Patrolman Eddie deal with the investigation and soon find themselves targeted by hitmen who proceed to harass the entire family to try to get them to drop the case. Meanwhile, Paul's eldest daughter Kate has doubts about her job when a young, 12-year-old criminal who she represented is paroled and later killed in a robbery when Eddie's partner is also killed. Paul's youngest daughter Jackie tries to get her life back on track by looking for a job, and ultimately decides to join the police academy to become a cop. Also, Paul's sister Shelly comes for a visit and is eventually nearly caught in the crossfire of the case.

Cast

 Charles Bronson as Commissioner Paul Fein
 Joe Penny as Ben Fein
 Diane Ladd  as Shelly Fein
 Sebastian Spence as Eddie Fein
 Barbara Williams as Kate Fein
 Angela Featherstone as Jackie Fein

References

External links
 

1997 films
1997 television films
1990s crime drama films
American crime drama films
Canadian crime drama films
Canadian drama television films
English-language Canadian films
Crime television films
Television sequel films
Films directed by David Greene
CBS network films
Trimark Pictures films
American drama television films
1990s American films
1990s Canadian films